Villemaur-sur-Vanne (literally Villemaur on Vanne) is a former commune in the Aube department in north-central France. On 1 January 2016, it was merged into the new commune Aix-Villemaur-Pâlis.

Population

See also 

 Communes of the Aube department

References 

Former communes of Aube
Aube communes articles needing translation from French Wikipedia
Populated places disestablished in 2016
States and territories disestablished in 2016